Vannier is the French word for a basket-maker.

People
 Jean-Claude Vannier (b. 1943), a French musician, composer and arranger
 Michael W. Vannier (b. 1949), an American radiologist in Chicago 
 Philippe Vannier (1762–1842), a French Navy officer and an adventurer

French-language surnames
Occupational surnames